"Tokyo (Vampires & Wolves)" is a song by Liverpudlian indie band the Wombats. It was the first single to be released from their second album This Modern Glitch. The song was added to the A-list on BBC Radio 1.

Background
In an interview with Digital Spy, drummer Dan Haggis said:
"We've approached this album slightly differently from the last.
"Whereas the first album was practically recorded live with a few overdubs, this time round we've had the time to really play with the sonics. Now we just can't wait to get out there and get sweaty."

Singer Matthew Murphy told XFM about the sound of the new single: "I don't think we consciously thought we'd make a synth-pop-whatever record. It just happened. There are a lot more keyboards and I didn't play as much guitar. It's quite an angsty, anxious song, wanting to run away from everything. A lot of our songs are escapist, I think."

The cover also bears a striking resemblance to Tokyo, Japan, with every smaller 'mini-city' filled with a different color.

Critical reception
Fraser McAlpine of BBC Chart Blog gave the song a positive review stating:

There are times when taking the things that clever people say on face value is a dangerous game.

Take this song. We all know that Matt Murphy is a smart man, with a keen eye for the wry, so it's a toss-up as to whether this is supposed to be a parody of all the songs bands write about the existential horrors of life on the road, or actually one of those songs bands write about the existential horrors of life on the road, only one with a keener-than-usual sense of self-awareness, written by a man with a knack for jamming up happy pop tunes with sad lyrics.

Or it could just be a genuine song about feeling dehumanised by the rigours of life in a touring pop band, and wanting to return to the one great night out that made it all seem worthwhile.

Or all of these things. Or none of these things. .

The song also came eighth in the largest music poll in the world, Australian radio station's Triple J's Hottest 100 of 2010.

Chart performance
"Tokyo (Vampires & Wolves)" debuted on the UK Singles Chart on 3 October 2010, where it debuted at number 23; marking the band's fifth top 40 hit and the third most successful of these behind "Moving to New York" and "Let's Dance to Joy Division", which reached numbers 13 and 15 respectively. The single spent only two weeks within the top 40, falling to number 32 in its second week and number 43 the week after. On 14 November, the single made its last appearance within the UK top 100 at number 99, marking its seventh and last week on the chart.

Track listings

Personnel
 Matthew Murphy – vocals, guitar, Casiotone MT-45, various synths 
 Tord Øverland Knudsen – backing vocals, bass guitar, Moog synthesizer, piano, percussion 
 Daniel Haggis – backing vocals, drums, piano, various synths

Charts

Certifications

Release history

References

14th Floor Records singles
2010 singles
2010 songs
Song recordings produced by Eric Valentine
Songs written by Dan Haggis
Songs written by Matthew Murphy
Songs written by Tord Øverland Knudsen
The Wombats songs